Horizon Christian School is a private Christian high school in Tualatin, Oregon, United States.

The school was a member of the Association of Christian Schools International from 1980 to 2011. It is accredited with Cognia.

The Horizon Hawks compete in the Oregon School Activities Association Lewis & Clark League (3A-1). They are not to be confused with Horizon Christian School in Hood River, Oregon, whose teams are also known as the Hawks but compete in the Big Sky League (1A-6).

References

High schools in Washington County, Oregon
Private middle schools in Oregon
Tualatin, Oregon
Educational institutions established in 1981
Christian schools in Oregon
Private elementary schools in Oregon
Private high schools in Oregon
1981 establishments in Oregon